Cabela's Sportsman's Challenge is a shooting sport simulation game developed by Diversions Software, Inc and released January 27, 1998.
The game was published by HeadGames Publishing, Inc., in conjunction with hunting supply company Cabela's.

External links

1998 video games
Windows games
Windows-only games
Activision games
Cabela's video games
Video games developed in the United States